John R. Gordner (born January 5, 1962) is an American attorney and politician. A Republican, he represented the 27th District in the Pennsylvania State Senate (2003–2022) and the 109th District in the Pennsylvania House of Representatives (1993–2003). He is a former Democrat, having switched parties in 2001.

Early life and education
Gordner was born on January 5, 1962 in Berwick, Pennsylvania, the son of Carl L. and Shirley Gordner. He graduated from Berwick Area High School in 1979. Gordner earned a Bachelor of Arts degree from Dickinson College in 1983 and a Juris Doctor degree from Dickinson School of Law in 1987.

Political career 
Gordner was elected to the Pennsylvania House of Representatives in 1992 and served 11 years in that body. 

In 2001, Gordner changed political parties from Democrat to Republican.

In 2003, he won a special election to represent Pennsylvania's 27th Senate District, replacing Ed Helfrick, who abruptly retired from the Senate earlier that year.

In 2022, Gordner resigned from the State Senate to become counsel to incoming President pro tempore of the Pennsylvania Senate Kim Ward.

Personal life 
Gordner is married to his wife, Lori. They have two children.

References

External links 

Gordner's official website

1962 births
Living people
Pennsylvania Democrats
Pennsylvania Republicans
People from Columbia County, Pennsylvania
21st-century American politicians
People from Berwick, Pennsylvania

Republican Party Pennsylvania state senators
Democratic Party members of the Pennsylvania House of Representatives
Republican Party members of the Pennsylvania House of Representatives